Canada competed at the 1988 Summer Olympics in Seoul, South Korea, held from 17 September to 2 October 1988. 328 competitors, 223 men and 105 women, took part in 193 events in 23 sports. Most Canadians remember these Olympics for Ben Johnson, who won the gold medal and set a world record in the men's 100 metres, before being disqualified and his record deleted after he tested positive for stanozolol.

Medalists

Competitors
The following is the list of number of competitors in the Games.

Archery

Canada was represented by three men and one woman in Seoul.

Women's individual competition:
Brenda Cuming – Preliminary round (→ 34th place)

Men's individual competition:
John McDonald – 1/8 final (→ 24th place)
Daniel Desnoyers – Preliminary round (→ 51st place)
Denis Canuel – Preliminary round (→ 58th place)

Men's team competition:
McDonald, Desnoyers, and Canuel – Preliminary round (→ 16th place)

Athletics

Men's Competition
Men's 10.000 metres
 Paul McCloy
 Heat – 29:34.07 (→ did not advance)

Men's 4 × 100 m relay
 Cyprian Enweani, Atlee Mahorn, Brian Morrison, Desai Williams
 38,93 (→ 7th place)

Men's 4 × 400 m relay
 Carl Folkes, John Graham, Paul Osland, Anton Skerritt
 3:09,48 (→ 15th place)

Men's 110 m hurdles
 Mark McKoy – 13,61 (→ 7th place)
 Stephen Kerho – DNF

Men's 400 m hurdles
 John Graham – 51,33 (→ 15th place)

Men's 3.000m Steeplechase
 Graeme Fell
 Heat – 8:51.25
 Semi-final – 8:19.99
 Final – 8:21.73 (→ 11th place)

Men's 20 km walk
 Guillaume Leblanc – 1:21:29 (→ 10th place)

Men's 50 km walk
 François Lapointe – 3:48:15 (→ 14th place)

Men's javelin throw
 Mike Mahovlich
 Qualification – 69.44m (→ did not advance)
 Stephen Feraday
 Qualification – 73.32m (→ did not advance)

Men's pole vault
 Paul Just
 Qualification – 5.30m (→ did not advance, 17th place)

Men's discus throw
 Ray Lazdins
 Qualifying Heat – 57.94m (→ did not advance)

Men's high jump
 Brian Marshall – 2,22 m (→ did not advance; tied for 17th place)
 Milton Ottey – 2,22 m (→ did not advance; tied for 17th place)

Men's long jump
 Bruny Surin – 7,73 m (→ 15th place)
 Glenroy Gilbert – 7,61 m (→ 22nd place)
 Ian James – 7,52 m (→ 25th place)

Men's Triple Jump
 Edrick Floreal – 16,11 m (→ 18th place)
 George Wright – 16,09 m (→ 19th place)

Men's marathon
 Art Boileau – 2:18:20 (→ 28th place)
 Peter Maher – 2:24:49 (→ 46th place)
 Dave Edge – 2:32:19 (→ 67th place)

Men's Decathlon
 Dave Steen – 8328 points (→  Bronze medal)
 100 metres – 11.18s
 Long jump – 7.44m
 Shot put – 14.20m
 High jump – 1.97m
 400 metres – 48.29s
 110m hurdles – 14.81s
 Discus throw – 43.66m
 Pole Vault – 5.20m
 Javelin throw – 64.16m
 1.500 metres – 4:23.20s

 Michael Smith – 8083 points (→ 14th place)
 100 metres – 10.99s
 Long jump – 7.37m
 Shot put – 13.61m
 High jump – 1.97m
 400 metres – 47.83s
 110m hurdles – 14.70s
 Discus throw – 43.88m
 Pole Vault – 4.30m
 Javelin throw – 66.54m
 1.500 metres – 4:28.97s

Women's Competition
Women's 4 × 400 m relay
 Charmaine Crooks, Esmie Lawrence, Marita Payne, and Jillian Richardson
 Heat – 3:27.63
 Charmaine Crooks, Molly Killingbeck, Marita Payne, and Jillian Richardson
 Final – did not finish (→ no ranking)

Women's marathon
 Odette Lapierre – 2:30:56 (→ 11th place)
 Lizanne Bussieres – 2:35:03 (→ 26th place)
 Ellen Rochefort – 2:36:44 (→ 31st place)

Women's javelin throw
 Céline Chartrand
 Qualification – 54.10m (→ did not advance)

Women's 800m
 Renee Belanger – (→ 24th place)

Baseball

Canada competed in the Baseball tournament that was held as a demonstration sport. They finished 7th.

Basketball

Men's tournament

Team roster

Group play

Quarterfinals

Classification round 5–8

Classification round 5/6

Boxing

Men's Light Flyweight (– 48 kg)
 Scott Olsen
 First round – bye
 Second round – defeated Washington Banian (Papua New Guinea), KO-1
 Third round – defeated Wayne McCullough (Ireland), 5:0
 Quarterfinals – lost to Michael Carbajal (United States), 0:5

Men's featherweight (– 57 kg)
 Jamie Pagendam
 First round – defeated Tserendorj Amarjargal (MGL), RSC-2
 Second round – lost to Kirkor Kirkorov (BUL), walk-over

Men's lightweight (– 60 kg)
 Asif Dar
 First round – bye
 Second round – lost to Phat Hongram (THA), RSC-2

Men's Light-Welterweight (– 63.5 kg)
 Howard Grant
 First round – bye
 Second round – defeated Andreas Otto (GDR), RSC-1
 Third Round – lost to Lars Myrberg (SWE), 1:4

Men's welterweight (– 67 kg)
 Manny Sobral
 First round – lost to Joni Nyman (FIN), 1:4

Men's Light Middleweight (– 71 kg)
 Raymond Downey →  Bronze medal
 First round – defeated Jorge López (ARG), 5:0
 Second round – defeated Norbert Nieroba (FRG), 3:2
 Third round – defeated Abrar Hussain Syed (PAK), 5:0
 Quarterfinals – defeated Martin Kitel (SWE), 5:0
 Semifinals – lost to Park Si-Hun (KOR), 0:5

Men's middleweight (– 75 kg)
 Egerton Marcus →  Silver medal
 First round – defeated Emmanuel Legaspi (PHI), KO-1
 Second round – defeated Darko Dukić (YUG), KO-2
 Quarterfinals – defeated Sven Ottke (FRG), 5:0
 Semifinals – defeated Hussain Shah Syed (PAK), 4:1
 Final – lost to Henry Maske (GDR), 0:5

Men's Light Heavyweight (– 81 kg)
 Brent Kosolofski
 First round – defeated Ahmed el-Masri (LEB), RSC-3
 Second round – lost to Andrea Magi (ITA), 1:4

Men's Heavyweight (– 91 kg)
 Tom Glesby
 First round – bye
 Second round – lost to Gyula Alvics (HUN), RSC-2

Men's Super Heavyweight (+ 91 kg)
 Lennox Lewis →  Gold medal
 First round – bye
 Second round – defeated Chris Odera (KEN), RSC-2
 Quarterfinals – defeated Ulli Kaden (GDR), RSC-1
 Semifinals – defeated Janusz Zarenkiewicz (POL), walk-over
 Final – defeated Riddick Bowe (USA), RSC-2

Canoeing

Cycling

Eleven cyclists, seven men and four women, represented Canada in 1988.

Road competition
Men's road race
 Gervais Rioux
 Yvan Waddell

Men's team time trial
 Chris Koberstein, David Spears, Yvan Waddell, and Brian Walton

Women's road race
 Geneviève Robic-Brunet – 2:00:52 (→ 4th place)
 Kelly-Ann Way – 2:00:52 (→ 38th place)
 Sara Neil – 2:00:52 (→ 39th place)

Track competition
Men's sprint
Curt Harnett

Men's 1 km time trial
Curt Harnett

Men's points race
Gianni Vignaduzzi

Women's sprint
Beth Tabor

Diving

Equestrianism

Fencing

18 fencers, 13 men and 5 women, represented Canada in 1988.

Men's foil
 Luc Rocheleau
 Benoît Giasson
 Stephen Angers

Men's team foil
 Stephen Angers, Benoît Giasson, Danek Nowosielski, Luc Rocheleau

Men's épée
 Michel Dessureault
 Alain Côté
 Jean-Marc Chouinard

Men's team épée
 Ian Bramall, Jean-Marc Chouinard, Alain Côté, Michel Dessureault, Danek Nowosielski

Men's sabre
 Jean-Paul Banos
 Jean-Marie Banos
 Wulfe Balk

Men's team sabre
 Wulfe Balk, Jean-Marie Banos, Jean-Paul Banos, Bruno Deschênes, Tony Plourde

Women's foil
 Madeleine Philion
 Jacynthe Poirier
 Thalie Tremblay

Women's team foil
 Marie-Huguette Cormier, Madeleine Philion, Jacynthe Poirier, Shelley Steiner, Thalie Tremblay

Gymnastics

Hockey

Men's team competition
Preliminary round (group B)
 Canada – West Germany 1-3
 Canada – Great Britain 0-3
 Canada – Soviet Union 0-0
 Canada – India 1-5
 Canada – South Korea 1-1
Classification matches
 9th-12th place: Canada – Spain 0-2
 11th-12th place: Canada – Kenya 3-1 (→ 11th place)
Team roster
 Ross Rutledge (captain)
 Nick Sandhu
 Rick Albert
 Patrick Burrows
 Paul "Bubli" Chohan
 Chris Gifford
 Wayne Grimmer
 Ranjeet Rai
 Peter Milkovich
 Trevor Porritt
 Ian Bird
 Doug Harris
 Michael Muller
 Pat Caruso
 Ajay Dube (gk)
 Ken Goodwin (gk)
Head Coach: Trevor Clark

Women's team competition
The women's field hockey team from Canada competed for the second time at the Summer Olympics.
Preliminary round (group B)
 Canada – Australia 1-1
 Canada – South Korea 1-3
 Canada – West Germany 1-2
Classification matches
 5th-8th place: Canada – Argentina 3-1
 5th-6th place: Canada – West Germany 2-4 (→ 6th place)
Team roster
 Sharon Bayes (gk)
 Wendy Baker (gk)
 Deb Covey
 Lisa Lyn
 Laura Branchaud
 Sandra Levy
 Kathryn Johnson
 Melanie Slade
 Penny Cooper
 Shona Schleppe
 Michelle Conn
 Liz Czenczek
 Sheila Forshaw
 Nancy Charlton
 Sara Ballantyne
 Sharon Creelman
Head Coach: Marina van der Merwe

Judo

Men's Extra-Lightweight (60 kg)
 Phil Takahashi

Men's Half-Lightweight (66 kg)
 Craig Weldon

Men's lightweight (73 kg)
 Glenn Beauchamp

Men's Half-Middleweight (81 kg)
 Kevin Doherty

Men's middleweight (90 kg)
 Louis Jani

Men's half-heavyweight (100 kg)
 Joseph Meli

Modern pentathlon

Three male pentathletes represented Canada in 1988.

Men's individual competition:
Lawrence Keyte – 4847 pts, 33rd place
Nicholas Fekete – 4785 pts, 40th place
Barry Kennedy – 4677 pts, 45th place

Men's team competition:
Keyte, Fekete, and Kennedy – 14309 pts, 11th place

Rhythmic gymnastics

Rowing

Sailing

Shooting

Swimming

Men's 50 m freestyle
 Mark Andrews
 Heat – 23.44
 B-Final – 23.64 (→ 15th place)

Men's 100 m freestyle
 Sandy Goss
 Heat – 50.81
 B-Final – 50.73 (→ 10th place)

Men's 400 m freestyle
 Turlough O'Hare
 Heat – 3:55.35
 B-Final – 3:54.33 (→ 11th place)
 Gary Vandermeulen
 Heat – 3:57.99 (→ did not advance, 26th place)

Men's 1500 m freestyle
 Christopher Chalmers
 Heat – 15:23.22 (→ did not advance, 16th place)
 Harry Taylor
 Heat – 15:30.31 (→ did not advance, 19th place)

Men's 100 m Backstroke
 Mark Tewksbury
 Heat – 56.20
 Final – 56.09 (→ 5th place)
 Sean Murphy
 Heat – 56.20
 Final – 56.32 (→ 8th place)

Men's 200 m Backstroke
 Sean Murphy
 Heat – 2:03.81 (→ did not advance, 17th place)
 Mark Tewksbury
 Heat – 2:04.02 (→ did not advance, 18th place)

Men's 100 m Breaststroke
 Victor Davis
 Heat – 1:02.48
 Final – 1:02.38 (→ 4th place)
 Cameron Grant
 Heat – 1:05.10 (→ did not advance, 31st place)

Men's 200 m Breaststroke
 Jonathan Cleveland
 Heat – 2:16.87
 Final – 2:17.10 (→ 7th place)
 Cameron Grant
 Heat – 2:17.62
 B-Final – 2:18.36 (→ 14th place)

Men's 100 m Butterfly
 Tom Ponting
 Heat – 54.31
 Final – 54.09 (→ 7th place)
 Vlastimil Černý
 Heat – 54.66
 B-Final – 54.79 (→ 12th place)

Men's 200 m Butterfly
 Tom Ponting
 Heat – 2:00.08
 Final – 1:58.91 (→ 4th place)
 Jon Kelly
 Heat – 1:59.40
 Final – 1:59.48 (→ 7th place)

Men's 200 m Individual Medley
 Gary Anderson
 Heat – 2:04.00
 Final – 2:06.35 (→ 8th place)
 Darren Ward
 Heat – 2:07.84 (→ did not advance, 21st place)

Men's 400 m Individual Medley
 Jon Kelly
 Heat – 4:24.62
 B-Final – 4:25.02 (→ 12th place)
 Michael Meldrum
 Heat – 4:31.74 (→ did not advance, 23rd place)

Men's 4 × 100 m freestyle Relay
 Mark Andrews, Stephen Vandermeulen, Vlastimil Černý, and Sandy Goss
 Heat – 3:23.85 (→ did not advance, 9th place)

Men's 4 × 200 m freestyle Relay
 Turlough O'Hare, Darren Ward, Donald Haddow, and Gary Vandermeulen
 Heat – 7:26.28
 Turlough O'Hare, Sandy Goss, Donald Haddow, and Gary Vandermeulen
 Final – 7:24.91 (→ 8th place)

Men's 4 × 100 m Medley Relay
 Mark Tewksbury, Victor Davis, Tom Ponting, and Sandy Goss
 Heat – 3:44.56
 Final – 3:39.28 (→  Silver medal)

Women's 50 m freestyle
 Kristin Topham
 Heat – 26.50
 B-Final – 26.45 (→ 12th place)
 Andrea Nugent
 Heat – 26.60 (→ did not advance, 19th place)

Women's 100 m freestyle
 Andrea Nugent
 Heat – 57.33 (→ did not advance, 17th place)
 Jane Kerr
 Heat – 57.55 (→ did not advance, 20th place)

Women's 200 m freestyle
 Patricia Noall
 Heat – 2:02.31
 B-Final – 2:00.77 (→ 9th place)
 Jane Kerr
 Heat – 2:04.92 (→ did not advance, 28th place)

Women's 400 m freestyle
 Patricia Noall
 Heat – 4:15.90
 B-Final – 4:14.70 (→ 13th place)

Women's 800 m freestyle
 Debra Wurzburger
 Heat – 8:36.24 (→ did not advance, 9th place)

Women's 100 m Backstroke
 Lori Melien
 Heat – 1:04.29
 B-Final – 1:03.87 (→ 12th place)

Women's 200 m Backstroke
 Lori Melien
 Heat – 2:20.45 (→ did not advance, 19th place)

Women's 100 m Breaststroke
 Allison Higson
 Heat – 1:09.39
 Final – 1:08.86 (→ 4th place)
 Keltie Duggan
 Heat – 1:10.95
 B-Final – 1:10.58 (→ 10th place)

Women's 200 m Breaststroke
 Allison Higson
 Heat – 2:29.67
 Final – 2:29.60 (→ 7th place)
 Guylaine Cloutier
 Heat – 2:34.36
 B-Final – 2:33.55 (→ 15th place)

Women's 100 m Butterfly
 Jane Kerr
 Heat – 1:02.91 (→ did not advance, 20th place)
 Andrea Nugent
 Heat – 1:03.69 (→ did not advance, 23rd place)

Women's 200 m Butterfly
 Mojca Cater
 Heat – 2:13.21
 B-Final – 2:12.66 (→ 9th place)
 Donna McGinnis
 Heat – DSQ (→ did not advance, no ranking)

Women's 200 m Individual Medley
 Allison Higson
 Heat – 2:19.54
 B-Final – scratched (→ did not advance, no ranking)

Women's 4 × 100 m freestyle Relay
 Kathy Bald, Kristin Topham, Allison Higson, and Jane Kerr
 Heat – 3:49.20
 Kathy Bald, Patricia Noall, Andrea Nugent, and Jane Kerr
 Final – 3:46.75 (→ 6th place)

Women's 4 × 100 m Medley Relay
 Lori Melien, Keltie Duggan, Jane Kerr, and Patricia Noall
 Heat – 4:14.23
 Lori Melien, Allison Higson, Jane Kerr, and Andrea Nugent
 Final – 4:10.49 (→  Bronze medal)

Synchronized swimming

Three synchronized swimmers represented Canada in 1988.

Women's solo
 Carolyn Waldo
 Michelle Cameron
 Karin Larsen

Women's duet
 Carolyn Waldo
 Michelle Cameron

Table tennis

Tennis

Men's Singles Competition
 Grant Connell
 First round – defeated John Fitzgerald (Australia) 6-4 4-6 6-2 6-2
 Second round – lost to Javier Sánchez (Spain) 4-6, 4-6, 2-6
 Martin Laurendeau
 First round – lost to Anders Järryd (Sweden) 6-7, 6-4, 5-7, 5-7
 Chris Pridham
 First round – lost to Martín Jaite (Argentina) 1-6, 3-6, 2-6

Women's Singles Competition
Jill Hetherington
 First round – defeated Ilana Berger (Israel) 6-1, 6-4
 Second round – lost to Pam Shriver (USA) 2-6, 3-6
Helen Kelesi
 First round – lost to Gisele Miró (Brazil) 5-7, 5-7
Carling Bassett-Seguso
 First round – lost to Nathalie Tauziat (France) 6-7, 1-6

Weightlifting

Wrestling

References

External links
sports-reference

Nations at the 1988 Summer Olympics
1988
Summer Olympics